The rue des Mathurins-Saint-Jacques, now known as the rue Du Sommerard after Alexandre Du Sommerard, is a street in the 5th arrondissement of Paris, in the Sorbonne quarter.